Sir Thomas Hanmer, 4th Baronet (24 September 1677 – 7 May 1746) was Speaker of the House of Commons of Great Britain from 1714 to 1715, discharging the duties of the office with conspicuous impartiality. His second marriage was the subject of much gossip as his wife eloped with his cousin Thomas Hervey  and lived openly with him for the rest of her days. He is, however, perhaps best remembered as being one of the early editors of the works of William Shakespeare.

He was identified with the Hanoverian Tory faction at the time of the Hanoverian Succession in 1714.

Life

He was the son of William Hanmer (born ca. 1648, Angers, France, died ca. 1678?, the son of Sir Thomas Hanmer, 2nd Baronet), and of Peregrine, daughter and co-heiress of Sir Henry North, 1st Baronet, of Mildenhall, Suffolk.

He was born between 10 and 11 p.m. in the house of his grandfather Sir Thomas Hanmer, 2nd Baronet, at Bettisfield Park, near Wrexham, Clwyd, Wales (formerly Flintshire). 

His father, William, seems to have died early, and Thomas was educated in Bury St Edmunds, at Westminster School and Christ Church, Oxford, matriculating on 17 October 1693, age 17. His tutor was Robert Freind, D.D., who was later under-master at Westminster in 1699, and headmaster 1711–1733. 

Hanmer gained his LL.D., however, Com. Reg. from Cambridge University in 1705.

He succeeded as 4th Baronet in 1701, when his uncle, the 3rd Baronet Sir John Hanmer, died in a duel leaving no issue.

He was a high church Tory M.P. for Thetford in 1701–02 and 1705–08; for Flintshire in 1702–05; and for Suffolk in 1708–27.  

He was unanimously elected Speaker of the House of Commons in February 1714, during the last Tory government for over 100 years; the Tory party was split between those (like Hanmer) who wished to maintain the Protestant succession in Britain, and those with Jacobite tendencies who supported James Stuart, the 'Old Pretender' of the Jacobite succession. After the death of Queen Anne in August 1714, George I brought in a government composed entirely of Whigs. The House of Commons was dissolved in January 1715, and Hanmer was not put forward for re-election: in his stead Spencer Compton (later 1st Earl of Wilmington and Prime Minister) was elected Speaker on 17 March 1715, although Hannmer continued to serve as an MP until 1727. The Tory party was proscribed from government office until 1760 and the accession of George III.

He was one of the founding governors of the Foundling Hospital, a charity set up for London's abandoned children in 1739, which also became a centre for the arts.

He also built and endowed a home for the impoverished elderly in Mildenhall, his mother's home village, in 1722. The home, called Bunbury Rooms for his brother-in-law and biographer Henry Edward Bunbury, serves a similar purpose today.

Literary activities
Hanmer's Shakespeare was published at Oxford in 1743–44, with nearly forty illustrations by Francis Hayman and Hubert Gravelot. The Cambridge History of English and American Literature states that "The print and binding were magnificent, and caused its value to rise to nine guineas, when Warburton’s edition was going for eighteen shillings."

Hanmer's editing, however, was based on his own selection of emendations from the Shakespeare editions of Alexander Pope and Lewis Theobald, along with his own conjectures, without indicating for the reader what was in his source texts and what was editorially corrected. Therefore, Hanmer's edition is not highly regarded today, with the editors of The Oxford Shakespeare assessing it in William Shakespeare: A Textual Companion as "one of the worst in the eighteenth century."

Also, Hanmer became the target of ridicule by Pope, who in his Dunciad lampoons him under the name Montalto (Book IV, 105ff.) and refers to him in a note (IV 113) as "An eminent person, who was about to publish a very pompous Edition of a great Author, at his own expense" (emphasis original).

However, there are some emendations of value that were made by Hanmer which have been accepted into later editions of Shakespeare.

Marriages and scandal 

He died in 1746 and was buried at Hanmer. He had married firstly in 1698 Isabella FitzRoy, Duchess of Grafton, the daughter and heiress of Henry Bennet, 1st Earl of Arlington, and widow of Henry Fitzroy, 1st Duke of Grafton, natural son of King Charles II.  She died in 1723.

He married secondly, in 1725, to Elizabeth Folkes, only daughter of Thomas Folkes, of Great Barton, Suffolk. Elizabeth was much younger than her husband and the couple were ill-suited; in particular, she did not share his love of Shakespeare. She caused a notable scandal a few years later by eloping with his cousin Thomas Hervey, younger son of John Hervey, 1st Earl of Bristol, by whom she had a son Thomas. Hervey, who was often said to be insane, subjected Hanmer to years of persecution over property which allegedly belonged to Elizabeth. Hanmer maintained that Elizabeth's father had settled the property strictly on his son-in-law, and that Elizabeth had no right to it. She died in 1741. Hanmer on his side threatened to "prosecute" Hervey (presumably he meant that he would bring a civil action for criminal conversation) but nothing seems to have come of it.

He had no heir by either marriage and so the baronetcy became extinct.

See also
Shakespeare's editors

References
Notes

Citations

External links
 
 

1677 births
1746 deaths
Baronets in the Baronetage of England
Speakers of the House of Commons of Great Britain
Early editions of Shakespeare
English book editors
English MPs 1701
English MPs 1701–1702
English MPs 1702–1705
English MPs 1705–1707
British MPs 1707–1708
British MPs 1708–1710
British MPs 1710–1713
British MPs 1713–1715
British MPs 1715–1722
British MPs 1722–1727
Members of the Parliament of England (pre-1707) for constituencies in Wales
Members of the Parliament of Great Britain for English constituencies